Rubus baileyanus, common name Bailey's dewberry, is a North American species of dewberry in section Flagellares of the genus Rubus, a member of the rose family. It is found in scattered locations in central Canada and in the eastern and north-central United States, primarily in the Appalachian Mountains. Its range extends from Massachusetts, Ontario, and Wisconsin south as far as Missouri, Tennessee, and North Carolina, though it is not common in any of those places.

References

External links
 

baileyanus
Plants described in 1840
Flora of the United States
Flora of Ontario